Mambillikalathil Govind Kumar Menon  (28 August 1928 – 22 November 2016) also known as M. G. K. Menon, was a physicist and policy maker from India. He had a prominent role in the development of science and technology in India over four decades. One of his most important contributions was nurturing the Tata Institute of Fundamental Research, Mumbai, which his mentor Homi J. Bhabha founded in 1945.

Born in Mangalore, he attended the University of Bristol for his PhD in elementary particle physics under the guidance of Nobel Laureate Cecil F. Powell. He joined the TIFR in 1955.

He undertook experiments with cosmic rays to explore the properties of fundamental particles. He was actively involved in setting up balloon flight experiments, as well as deep underground experiments with cosmic ray neutrinos in the mines at Kolar Gold Fields. He was the Director of the Tata Institute of Fundamental Research, Mumbai (1966–1975), President of the Indian Statistical Institute, the Vikram Sarabhai Fellow of the Indian Space Research Organisation, President of the National Academy of Sciences, India, Chairman Board of Governors, Indian Institute of Technology, Bombay and chairman Board of Governors of the Indian Institute of Information Technology, Allahabad.

He won the Abdus Salam Award, and was a member of the Pontifical Academy of Sciences. He was one of the most prominent scientists from the state of Kerala and was elected a Fellow of the Royal Society in May 1970. The asteroid 7564 Gokumenon was named in his honour in late 2008.

Early life and education
M. G. K. Menon was educated at Jaswant College, Jodhpur, and the Royal Institute of Science, Bombay (now called The Institute of Science, Mumbai), before he moved to the University of Bristol for his PhD in elementary particle physics under the guidance of Nobel Laureate Cecil F. Powell in 1953.

Career
Menon joined Tata Institute of Fundamental Research in 1955 "essentially because of Bhabha", and the association lasted nearly five decades. He became the director of the institute in 1966, at the age of 38, following Bhabha's untimely death. In fact, Menon began handling the affairs of the institute ever since he was 33, because of Bhabha's increasing involvement with the country's nascent atomic energy programme.

Menon was the chairman of the ISRO in 1972. He was a member of the Planning Commission (1982–1989), Scientific Adviser to the Prime Minister (1986–1989) and vice-president, Council of Scientific & Industrial Research (CSIR) (1989–1990).

Menon was elected as a Member of Parliament, Rajya Sabha during 1990–96. In 1989, then Prime Minister of India, Vishwanath Pratap Singh appointed him as the Minister of State for Science, Technology and Education.

Awards and recognition 

 He won the Abdus Salam Medal in 1996
 Special Awards: He won the Padma Shri in 1961, Padma Bhushan in 1968 and Padma Vibhushan in 1985.
 The asteroid 7564 Gokumenon was named in his honour in late 2008.

Personal life 
While working towards his doctoral degree in particle physics at the University of Bristol under Professor Cecil F. Powell, Menon met and married Indumati Patel, who was working towards a degree in philosophy. They have two children, Anant K. Menon, Professor of Biochemistry at Weill Cornell Medicine in New York City, and Preeti Vaid, a practicing radiologist in New Delhi. Menon has two grandchildren, Kartikeya M. Menon, a medical student at the Icahn School of Medicine at Mount Sinai in New York City, and Ravi Vaid, who is working in corporate finance in Mumbai.

References

External links
Article by Menon: Impact of Advances in science and new technologies on society
Article on Menon
Interview about India's nuclear program for the WGBH series, War and Peace in the Nuclear Age
Activists Condemn Gujarat Violence, Screen New Documentary 

1928 births
2016 deaths
20th-century Indian physicists
Scientists from Mangalore
People from Ottapalam
Fellows of the Indian National Science Academy
Fellows of The National Academy of Sciences, India
Fellows of the Royal Society
Foreign Members of the USSR Academy of Sciences
Foreign Members of the Russian Academy of Sciences
Alumni of the University of Bristol
Recipients of the Padma Vibhushan in civil service
Recipients of the Padma Bhushan in medicine
Recipients of the Padma Shri in science & engineering
Janata Dal politicians
Rajya Sabha members from Rajasthan
21st-century Indian physicists